Our Lady, Star of the Sea is an ancient title for the Virgin Mary. The words Star of the Sea are a translation of the Latin title .

The title has been in use since at least the early medieval period. Purportedly arising from a scribal error in a supposed etymology of the name Mary, it came to be seen as allegorical of Mary's role as "guiding star" on the way to Christ. Under this name, the Virgin Mary is believed to intercede as a guide and protector of seafarers in particular. The Apostleship of the Sea and many coastal churches are named  or Star of the Sea.

Etymology and history

The name stella maris is first applied to the Virgin Mary in the manuscript tradition of Saint Jerome's Latin translation of the Onomasticon by Eusebius of Caesarea, although this is in fact a misnomer based on a transcription error. 
For reaching this meaning the Hebrew name  (originally pronounced "Maryam", but by Masoretic times pronounced "Miryam") was first rendered into Greek as Mariam. It was this form that was etymologized by Eusebius. He interpreted Maryām as mar-yam "drop of the sea", based on  mar, a rare biblical word for "drop". St Jerome adopted this interpretation and translated the name into Latin as stilla , "drop of the sea", but at some later stage a copyist transcribed this into , "star of the sea", and this transcription error became widespread.

Another opinion states that Jerome himself interpreted the name as meaning "star of the sea" or Stella Maris, by relating it to a Hebrew word for star,  (ma'or), from the verb  ('or), to be light or shine.

The etymologization of the name of Mary as "star of the sea" was widespread by the early medieval period. It is referenced in Isidore's Etymologiae (7th century). The plainsong hymn  ("Hail, Star of the Sea") dates from about the 8th century. Paschasius Radbertus in the 9th century has an allegorical explanation of the name, writing that Mary is the "Star of the Sea" to be followed on the way to Christ, "lest we capsize amid the storm-tossed waves of the sea."

In the medieval period,  came to be used as a name of Polaris in its role as lodestar (guiding star, north star); it may have been used as such since Late Antiquity, as it is referred to as  "always visible" by Stobaeus in the 5th century, even though it was still some eight degrees removed from the celestial pole at that time.

In the twelfth century, Saint Bernard of Clairvaux wrote: "If the winds of temptation arise; if you are driven upon the rocks of tribulation look to the star, call on Mary. If you are tossed upon the waves of pride, of ambition, of envy, of rivalry, look to the star, call on Mary. Should anger, or avarice, or fleshly desire violently assail the frail vessel of your soul, look at the star, call upon Mary."

Anthony of Padua also wrote of Mary as Star of the Sea.

Pope Pius XII, in his encyclical , also quoted Bernard of Clairvaux in saying: "Mary… is interpreted to mean 'Star of the Sea'. This admirably befits the Virgin Mother… (for) as the ray does not diminish the brightness of the star, so neither did the Child born of her tarnish the beauty of Mary's virginity."

Stella maris was occasionally also used in reference to Christ. Robert Bellarmine (writing c. 1600) deprecated this use of the title, preferring the allegory of Christ as the morning star as the "brightest star of all", classing the less-bright polar star as "paltry".

Devotional application

The idea of Mary as a guiding star for seafarers has led to devotion to Our Lady, Star of the Sea in many Catholic coastal and fishing communities. Numerous churches, schools and colleges are dedicated to ", Our Lady Star of the Sea," or "Mary, Star of the Sea."

Stella Maris Monastery, the foundation house of the Carmelite order, was established on Mount Carmel in Haifa in the early thirteenth century. The abbey was destroyed several times, but a refounded  monastery is still considered the headquarters of the order.

Devotions to this title of Mary are found in the popular Catholic hymn, Hail Queen of Heaven, the Ocean Star and the ancient prayer . The widely sung "Sicilian Mariners Hymn", also reflects this devotion.

Patronage
Our Lady, Star of the Sea is the patroness of the Netherlands, as well as the American state of Hawaii. The Roman Catholic Church honors Our Lady, Star of the Sea, with a feast day assigned to 27 September.

Seafarers
Our Lady Star of the Sea is the patron of the AOS.

It is a day to pray for all seafarers and give thanks for their contribution to global trade. The dates, times and venues of  Masses for 2019 in England and Scotland can be found here . At a gathering during the  Mass in Westminster Cathedral in 2016, Archbishop of Westminster Cardinal Vincent Nichols said, "Caring for seafarers is a profoundly Christian thing to do."

Gallery

See also
 Star of the Sea Church (disambiguation)
 Miriam (given name)

Notes

References

External links

Titles of Mary

pt:Stella Maris